The Northern Sami Wikipedia is the edition of Wikipedia in the Northern Sami language.

It was used as one example of how Wikipedia's categories system works (in the context of social ontologies).

Statistics 

It started in 2004 and has  articles, ranking  of all Wikipedias.

Readers
It is 134th of about 290 in number of page requests: half a million page requests per month, but not possible to know how many human readers.

Content
It is 137th of about 290 in number of articles (there are ); articles are about 500 characters long on average with approximately 400 000 words in total. It's above average in terms of editors/speakers and articles/speakers, there are many articles about towns around the world (mostly automated creations).

User activity
There were almost no new articles in 2008–2011, new articles usually come in bursts; in 2013 editing activity was lower than in previous years with fewer than 10 active editors per month making fewer than 100 edits per month.
There are currently  active users and activity is still low.

Notes

External links

  Northern Sami Wikipedia
  Northern Sami Wikipedia mobile version

Finnish-language encyclopedias
Wikipedias by language
Internet properties established in 2004